Results from Norwegian football in 1929.

Østlandsligaen 1928/29 (Unofficial)

Hovedserien

Promoted: Fram (Larvik), Selbak, Storm, Strong and Strømsgodset.

Best placed club from each of the five local association leagues 1929 promoted.

Class A of local association leagues
Class A of local association leagues (kretsserier) is the predecessor of a national league competition.

1In the following season, Søndmøre local association changed name to Sunnmøre.
2In the following season, Romsdalske local association changed name to Nordmøre og Romsdal.

Norwegian Cup

Final

Northern Norwegian Cup

Final

National team

Sources:

References

     
Seasons in Norwegian football